The Gumbaynggirr people, also rendered Kumbainggar, Gumbangeri and other variant spellings, are an Aboriginal Australian people of the Mid North Coast of New South Wales. Gumbathagang was a probable clan or sub-group. The traditional lands of the Gumbaynggirr nation stretch from Tabbimoble Yamba-Clarence River to Ngambaa-Stuarts Point, SWR- Macleay to Guyra and to Oban.

History

Clement Hodgkinson was the first European to make contact with the local Aboriginal community when he explored the upper reaches of the Nambucca and Bellinger Rivers in March 1841. Three decades later, loggers began to work their way up through the Orara River cedar stands in the 1870s. Over c.1873-1874, J.W. Lindt produced photographs of local indigenous people both in their environment and conducting actual traditional ceremonies in the Clarence River district, and made portraits in his studio. Contemporary commentary records them as "the first successful attempt at representing the native blacks truthfully as well as artistically." The Sydney Morning Herald, of 24 November 1874 expanded on what made the photographs attractive to Europeans:

The report clearly sets out a cynical nostalgia for the traditional ways of these people made sentimental by noting their 'decreasing numbers', expressing a common attitude amongst the colonists that the Indigenous populations were doomed. However, the individuals in Lindt's group portraits and their clans and languages (Gumbaynggirr and Bandjalung), are not named, the 'scenery' is generic, and the accessories not those of the people depicted.

In clearing the land, the loggers opened up the prospect of selectors to squat on the tribal territories in the early 1880s. Soon after, in that same decade, a shepherd was murdered in the area and a hunting party was dispatched to exact revenge, resulting in the Red Rock Massacre. The slaughter started at Blackadder Creek where the Gumbaynggirr were camping. Mounted troopers entered the camp and began shooting. Those who fled were tracked down to the Corindi Creek where more were shot. Those who survived were driven to the headland and herded off the rocks into the sea. The hunters kept shooting at the swimmers, but some hid in a cave and made their way to Corindi Lake further south. One of the survivors was the present day elder Tony Perkins' grandmother, who crouched down in a thicket of bulrushes with a child in her arms.

After a court battle lasting two decades, the Gumbaynggirr claim to much of the reserve around the site in 2014 was confirmed by the New South Wales Land and Environment Court.

Many Aboriginal reserves and missions were established in NSW by the Aboriginal Protection Board. This resulted in relocation of Aboriginal people from their ancestral homes, only to be returned later after years of trauma (the Stolen Generations)

The Gumbaynggirr have the largest midden-shell deposit in the Southern Hemisphere.

Country
The Gumbaynggirr lands extend over an estimated , covering an area of the Mid North Coast from the Nambucca River to as far north as the Clarence River (Grafton), and eastward to the Pacific coast. Norman Tindale specified its limits as bounded by the lower course of Nymboida River, stating that the territory ran toward Urunga, Coffs Harbour, and Bellingen. It included South Grafton and Glenreagh. It took in the coastal strip south from near One Tree Point, Woolgoolga and Nambucca Heads. The thin coastal zone from Coffs Harbour to Evans Head was Yaygir territory.

To their north were the twenty groups speaking various dialects of the Bandjalang. The Jukambal were to their west and the Nganyaywana/Anēwan in the environs of (Armidale). Their southern boundaries met with those of the Djangadi and Ngamba.

Language

Gumbaynggir is classified as one of the two Gumbaynggiric languages of the Pama–Nyungan family. In 1986, the Muurrbay Aboriginal Language and Culture Co-operative was established by Gumbaynggirr elders to revive their language and hand it on. Language classes began in 1997, and by 2010, some several hundred people had some partial grasp of the language.

Culture
Muurrbay in Gumbaynggir means the white fig tree and plays an important part in the Gumbaynggir Yuludarla (Gumbaynggir Dreamings).

The Gumbaynggirr made sweets (bush lollies, called jaaning) by rolling tender shoots from the Acacia irrorata in the sap oozing from the tree.

Some words
 Giinagay (hello).
 Yaam darruy ngiina gaduyaygu (It's good to meet you).
 Yaarri yarraang. (goodbye).

Alternative names
 Coombagoree, Gumbanggar
 Coombangree, Coombyngura, Coombyngara, Coombargaree, Kombinegherry
 Gumbainggar, Gunbainggar, Gumbaingar, Guinbainggiri
 Gumbangeri
 Kombaingheri, Kombinegherry, Kumbangerai, Koombanggary, Koombanggherry, Koombainga

Possible clans or sub-tribes
 Gumbathagang, under "King Robert" in the late 19th century (aka "King Bobby" "King Malawangi", or Bobby/Billy King)
 Nimboy (a horde)
 Orara (name of a river)
 Woolgoolga (a horde)

Notable people
 Frank Archibald, after whom the Frank Archibald Memorial Lecture Series was named
 Aretha Brown, youth activist
 Troy Cassar-Daley, country music singer-songwriter from Halfway Creek/Grafton NSW
 Emma Donovan, singer and songwriter (Gumbaynggirr heritage from mother's side)
 Gary Foley, activist, academic, writer and actor
 Albert Kelly, rugby league player
 Tasman Keith, hip hop artist
 Loretta Kelly, law academic
 Aden Ridgeway, former Australian Senator

Notes

Citations

Sources

Aboriginal peoples of New South Wales